Kent is a county in South East England.

Kent may also refer to:

Places
Kent County (disambiguation)
Kent Island (disambiguation)
Kent Street (disambiguation)
Kent Township (disambiguation)

Australia
 Kent, the former name of Kent Land District, Tasmania
Kent Group of islands, in Bass Strait
Kent Town

Canada
Kent (1827–1974 electoral district)
Kent (New Brunswick electoral district) (1867–1966)
Kent (Ontario electoral district) (1867–1903; 1914–1966; 1976–1996)
Kent (Ontario provincial electoral district) (1867–1875, 1967–1987)
Kent (provincial electoral district) (New Brunswick)
Kent, British Columbia
Kent Parish, New Brunswick, civil parish in Carleton County, New Brunswick
Kent Peninsula, in Nunavut

Ireland
 Kent Park in Ballydoogan, County Sligo

Kazakhstan
Kent Range, Kazakhstan

Sierra Leone
 Kent, Sierra Leone, a village

United Kingdom
 Kingdom of Kent, originally The Kingdom of the Kentish, an early medieval kingdom
 River Kent, in Cumbria, northern England

United States
Kent, Elmore County, Alabama
Kent, Pike County, Alabama
Kent, California, former name of Kentfield, California
Kent, Connecticut
Kent, Florida
Kent, Iowa
Kent, Illinois
Kent, Jefferson County, Indiana
Kent Narrows, a waterway in Maryland
Kent, Minnesota
Kent, New York
Kent, Ohio
Kent, Oregon
Kent, Texas
Kent, Washington
Kent (Washington, D.C.), a neighborhood
Kent, West Virginia

People
Kent (given name)
Kent (surname)
Duke of Kent
Earl of Kent

Brands and enterprises
Kent (brand), an electric guitar brand
Kent (cigarette), a cigarette brand
Kent Building Supplies, Canadian retail hardware chain
Kent RO Systems, Indian reverse osmosis water purifier brand

Education

United Kingdom
University of Kent, Kent, England

United States
Chicago–Kent College of Law, Chicago, Illinois
Kent City School District, a public school district in Kent, Ohio
Kent Hall at Columbia University in New York City
Kent School District, a public school district in Kent, Washington
Kent School, a private high school in Kent, Connecticut
Kent State University, Kent, Ohio
Kent State shootings
Kent State Golden Flashes the athletic teams representing Kent State

Music
Kent (band), a Swedish rock band
Kent (album), their first album
Kent (guitar), an electric guitar series
Kent Records, a record label

Transportation
Cork Kent railway station, in Ireland
Ford Kent engine, used in for instance Ford Anglia
HMS Kent, a ship
, a number of East Indiamen carried the name Kent
Kent Station (OC Transpo), a bus stop in Ottawa's downtown transit corridor
New Kent Road in London
Old Kent Road in London

Other uses
Kent (mango), a cultivar from Florida, USA
KENT (AM), a radio station in Enterprise, Nevada, United States
KAZZ (AM), a radio station (1400 AM) licensed to serve Parowan, Utah, United States, which held the call sign KENT from 2004 to 2014
Kent Institution, a maximum-security prison in Agassiz, British Columbia, Canada
Kent Recursive Calculator, a programming language
AS-15 Kent, the NATO codename for the Russian Kh-55 cruise missile
Kent, an alternate name for the card game Kemps

See also

Lineage B.1.1.7, the Kent (UK) variant of the COVID-19 virus SARS-CoV-2